Gregory River, Queensland may refer to:

 Gregory River, Queensland (Bundaberg Region), a locality in the Bundaberg Region
 Gregory River, Queensland (Whitsunday Region), a locality in the Whitsunday Region
 Gregory River (Australia), a river than flows into the Gulf of Carpentaria